In Greek mythology, the name Naubolus (Ancient Greek: Ναύβολος) may refer to:

Naubolus of Phocis, son of Ornytus (or of Hippasus), and King of Phocis. By Perineike, daughter of Hippomachus, he became the father of the Argonaut Iphitos, and also of Antiphateia, who married Crisus.
Naubolus, father of Pylon, king of Oechalia. The latter's daughter Antiope was the mother, by Eurytus, of Iole, Didaeon, Deioneus, Toxeus, Clytius, Molion and another Iphitos, of whom the last two are also counted among the Argonauts.
Naubolus of Argos, who belonged to the lineage that linked the two figures of the name Nauplius: Nauplius I - Proetus - Lernus - Naubolus - Clytoneus (Clytius) - Nauplius II (the Argonaut).
Naubolus, a Phaeacian, father of Euryalus.

Notes

References 

 Apollonius Rhodius, Argonautica translated by Robert Cooper Seaton (1853-1915), R. C. Loeb Classical Library Volume 001. London, William Heinemann Ltd, 1912. Online version at the Topos Text Project.
 Apollonius Rhodius, Argonautica. George W. Mooney. London. Longmans, Green. 1912. Greek text available at the Perseus Digital Library.
 Gaius Julius Hyginus, Fabulae from The Myths of Hyginus translated and edited by Mary Grant. University of Kansas Publications in Humanistic Studies. Online version at the Topos Text Project.
 Hesiod, Catalogue of Women from Homeric Hymns, Epic Cycle, Homerica translated by Evelyn-White, H G. Loeb Classical Library Volume 57. London: William Heinemann, 1914. Online version at theio.com
 Homer, The Odyssey with an English Translation by A.T. Murray, PH.D. in two volumes. Cambridge, MA., Harvard University Press; London, William Heinemann, Ltd. 1919. Online version at the Perseus Digital Library. Greek text available from the same website.
 Publius Papinius Statius, The Thebaid translated by John Henry Mozley. Loeb Classical Library Volumes. Cambridge, MA, Harvard University Press; London, William Heinemann Ltd. 1928. Online version at the Topos Text Project.
 Publius Papinius Statius, The Thebaid. Vol I-II. John Henry Mozley. London: William Heinemann; New York: G.P. Putnam's Sons. 1928. Latin text available at the Perseus Digital Library.

Argive characters in Greek mythology
Phaeacians in Greek mythology
Phocian characters in Greek mythology
Boeotian mythology